The river Durdent is one of the many small coastal rivers that flow from the plateau of the Pays de Caux into the English Channel.

Course
The river rises just northwest of Yvetot, near Héricourt-en-Caux, at the meeting of the two streams, the Saint-Denis and the Saint-Riquier, then takes a north-northwest route, typical of the rivers of the Seine-Maritime department. It passes through the villages of Robertot, Sommesnil, Oherville, Le Hanouard, Clasville, Grainville-la-Teinturière, Cany-Barville, Vittefleur and Paluel and empties into the English Channel at Veulettes-sur-Mer. In earlier times, it powered many watermills along its course.

Flora and fauna

The Durdent valley is home to many bats such as the rare vespers bat, the large and lesser  horseshoe bat and the mouse-eared bats. More common species, such as the long-eared bat and Daubenton's Bat are present in large numbers. Kniphofia (red-hot pokers) grow in a few places along the river's course.

See also
Schéma directeur d'aménagement et de gestion des eaux

References

Rivers of France
Rivers of Normandy
Rivers of Seine-Maritime
0Durdent